Minas Morgul is the second full-length album by the Austrian black metal band Summoning. The band and many of their fans consider this album to be their debut album as it developed the "Summoning sound" and brought the band to a larger audience due to its lyrics involving J. R. R. Tolkien's themes.

Reception

The album received dominantly positive reviews. It was criticized for the vocals and Kraftwerk-esque drum sound, but was praised for its context referencing Tolkien. Sputnik describes the band's sound as bombastic and unique because the synths provide medieval sounds, giving it an amazing result when fused with guitars. Metal Storm considers the album as one of the most appreciated black metal releases.

Track listing

Credits
Protector  – vocals, guitar, keyboards
Silenius – bass, keyboards, vocals

Illustration
The front illustration of the album comes from Mark Harrison's painting, The Call of the Sword, originally done in 1988 to illustrate the Roger Taylor's novel of the same name.

See also
 Minas Morgul (Middle-earth)

References

1995 albums
Summoning (band) albums
Napalm Records albums
Things named after Tolkien works